Gazzetta del Popolo was an Italian daily newspaper founded in Turin, in northern Italy, on 16 June 1848. It ceased publication on 31 December 1983 after 135 years of operation. Italian novelist Alberto Moravia is among the former contributors to the paper.

References

Further reading
 1851 issues

External links
 Official History of Gazzetta del Popolo

1848 establishments in the Kingdom of Sardinia
1848 establishments in Italy
1983 disestablishments in Italy
Defunct newspapers published in Italy
Italian-language newspapers
Newspapers published in Turin
Publications established in 1848
Publications disestablished in 1983
Daily newspapers published in Italy